Pilathara is a suburb town of Payyannur in the Kannur district of Kerala, India.
This region is noted for its cultural, traditional and religious characteristics. The Government Medical College, Kannur aka Pariyaram Medical College is just 4 km away from Pilathara. Pazhayangadi and Mathamangalam are located south and north of Pilathara respectively. It comes under Payyanur taluk and Cheruthazham village. Kannur International Airport is the nearest airport of about 50 km away. The nearby railway station is at Pazhayangadi, just 8 km away from Pilathara town.

Samskriti Sahajeevan Heritage Museum
Samskriti-Sahajeevanam Heritage museum-Palamruthillam is a traditional Bungalow of the Brahmans built according to the architectural style of Kerala. The conventional residence of 4900 sq.feet two storey structure has extensive wooden carvings. Every nook and corner of this Illam is blessed with the minute carvings of different features. Almost 40 wooden frames and doors are showing the unique richness of this Illam. The Illam is owned and maintained by Samskrti, Pariyaram which is an institute of Cultural Research and action under Jesuit - run Socio- Cultural Centre.

Educational Institutions
 Pilathara Co-op Arts & Science College
 St. Joseph's College, Pilathara 
 Govt Institute for Paramedical Science, Pilathara
 Lasya College of Music and Dance, Pilathara
 Wadihuda Institute of Research and Advanced Studies, Vilayancode

Villages near Pilathara
Ezhome,Cheruthazham, Edat, Kandamkulangara, Kunhimangalam, Perumba,Mathamangalam Ezhilode, Kadannappally and Pariyaram.

Other places near Pilathara
Payyannur 7 km from Pilathara
Taliparamba 13 km from Pilathara
Bekal Fort 48 km from Pilathara
Payyambalam Beach 35 km from Pilathara
Cherupuzha 30 km from Pilathara

Transportation
The national highway-66 passes through Pilathara junction. Goa and Mumbai can be accessed on the northern side and Cochin and Thiruvananthapuram can be accessed on the southern side. Other major roads are Pilathara-Pazhayangadi-Pappimisseri Road and Mathamangalam-Pilathara Road. In that, Pappinisseri Pilathara KSTP road act as an NH bypass that reduces the distance and travel time between Kannur and Payyanur.
The town has one bus terminal- Pilathara Bus Stand. The nearest railway stations are Payyanur and Pazhayangadi on Mangalore-Palakkad line. 
Trains are available to almost all parts of India subject to advance booking over the internet.  There are airports at Kannur, Mangalore and Calicut. All of them are international airports but direct flights are available only to Middle Eastern countries.

See also
 Mathamangalam
 Kadannappally
 Vellora
 Olayampadi
 Pariyaram
 Eramam

References

Cities and towns in Kannur district
 Villages near Pilathara